Cross-country flying ( XC flying) is a type of distance flying which is performed in a powered aircraft on legs over a given distance and in operations between two points using navigational techniques; and an unpowered aircraft (paraglider, hang glider or sailplane) by using upcurrents to gain altitude for extended flying time.  Cross country is distinct from purely aerial work in a small defined area requiring little navigation.

Official definitions by country

Canada
Transport Canada does not provide a definition of "cross-country" flight in the Canadian Aviation Regulations (CARs), however, a general consensus among pilots is that, in order to log "cross-country time" in a Pilot's Logbook, the pilot must have demonstrated some kind of navigational ability during the logged period of time.  This is substantiated by references to:
the requirement to file a flight plan beyond 25 nautical miles of the departure aerodrome for "cross-country flights,"
the requirement to carry an Emergency Locator Transmitter for "cross-country flights," and
the stipulations in the Commercial Licence Requirements for travel between two different airports.

In many cases, however, there are conflicts of opinion as to the definition; if, for example, a pilot flew from Langley Airport (CYNJ) to Abbotsford Airport (CYXX), the distance would be only 12 NM.  In this instance, calling the flight "cross-country" seems not to fit within the requirement to use "navigational ability" since the two airports are within sight of one another even from very low altitudes.

Europe

European Union (EU) countries 

The Official Journal of the European Union for European Aviation Safety Agency (EASA) members provides a definition of cross-country flight as "a flight between a point of departure and a point of arrival following a pre-planned route, using standard navigation procedures."

United States
Per title 14 of the code of federal regulations (14 CFR), a.k.a. the Federal Aviation Regulations (FARs), part 61, section 1.b.3
(3) Cross-country time means--

References

External links
 Cross Country Flying 101

General aviation
Aircraft operations